The 14th Pan American Games were held in Santo Domingo, Dominican Republic from August 1 to August 17, 2003.

Medals

Bronze

Men's Mountain Bike: Deiber Esquivel

Results by event

Cycling

Road
Juan Pablo Araya
 Men's Road Time Trial — + 5.33 (→ 14th place)

Mountain Bike
Deiber Esquivel
 Men's Cross Country — + 1.49 (→ 3rd place)
José Adrián Bonilla
 Men's Cross Country — did not finish (→ no ranking)
Karen Matamoros
 Women's Cross Country — + 1 lap (→ 6th place)

Triathlon

See also
Costa Rica at the 2004 Summer Olympics

References

Nations at the 2003 Pan American Games
P
Costa Rica at the Pan American Games